Gyrate may refer to:

 Gyrus, a ridge on the cerebral cortex
 Gyration, a type of rotation

Music
 Gyrate (album), a 1980 album by Pylon
 "Gyrate", song by Pylon from Chomp (album)
 "Gyrate", song by WizKid from Made in Lagos